Bandar Sultan Suleiman is an industrial zone and residential hub in Port Klang, Selangor, Malaysia located near Northport.

Klang District
Townships in Selangor